Persiani is an Italian surname. Notable people with the surname include:

 Fanny Tacchinardi Persiani (1812–1867), an Italian soprano singer.
 Giuseppe Persiani (1799–1869), an Italian opera composer.
 Luca Persiani (born 1984), an Italian racing driver.
 Mauro Persiani (born 1956), a retired Italian professional football player.

Italian-language surnames